Kingswood was a non-metropolitan district in Avon, England. It was abolished on 1 April 1996 and replaced by South Gloucestershire.

Political control
From the first election to the council in 1973 until its abolition in 1996, political control of the council was held by the following parties:

Council elections
1973 Kingswood District Council election
1976 Kingswood District Council election (New ward boundaries)
1979 Kingswood District Council election
1983 Kingswood District Council election
1987 Kingswood Borough Council election (New ward boundaries)
1991 Kingswood Borough Council election

References

External links

 
Kingswood, South Gloucestershire
Council elections in Avon
District council elections in England